William H. Peeps (1868–1950) was an American architect.

At least two of his works are listed on the U.S. National Register of Historic Places (NRHP).

Works include:
Latta Arcade, 320 S. Tryon St., Charlotte, North Carolina, NRHP-listed
Masonic Hall, 114 Church St., Waynesville, North Carolina, NRHP-listed

References

Architects from North Carolina
1868 births
1950 deaths
19th-century American architects
20th-century American architects